Raymi may refer to:

 Ali Raymi, Yemeni boxer
 Inti Raymi, religious ceremony of the Inca Empire